C.S. Army Tug Neptune (c. 1862–1863) was a wooden tugboat taken over by the Confederate States Army in about 1862 for the Texas Marine Department. She was employed as a tug, transport, and lookout vessel in the vicinity of Galveston, Texas. 

On 1 January 1863, during the Battle of Galveston, Confederate troops used her and the gunboat CS Bayou City in an effort to board and capture the United States Revenue Cutter Service revenue cutter USRC Harriet Lane. Though the enterprise was a success, Neptune was badly damaged and sank shortly afterwards.

References

Ships of the Confederate States Army
Tugboats of the United States
Shipwrecks of the Texas coast
Shipwrecks in the Gulf of Mexico
Shipwrecks of the American Civil War
Maritime incidents in January 1863
1862 ships